"Luther Played the Boogie" is a song written and originally recorded by Johnny Cash. Luther is Luther Perkins, the guitarist in Cash's band.

The song was recorded on July 10, 1958. during Cash's final sessions for Sun Records. It would be released as a single (Sun 316, with "Thanks a Lot", another song from the same session, on the opposite side) on February 15 of the next year, when he already left the label for Columbia.

Before that, the song appeared on Sun Records' album Greatest! Johnny Cash, that came out in January 1959.

Cash received a BMI award for this single.

Charts

References 

Johnny Cash songs
1959 singles
Songs written by Johnny Cash
Sun Records singles
1959 songs